Elena Kostantinovna Romanovskaya (born 3 December 1984) is a Russian former competitive ice dancer. With partner Alexander Grachev, she won the 2004 World Junior title.

Programs 
(with Grachev)

Competitive highlights 
GP: Grand Prix; JGP: Junior Grand Prix

 with Grachev

References

External links 
 
 Romanovskaya / Grachev official site

Russian female ice dancers
Living people
Figure skaters from Moscow
1984 births
World Junior Figure Skating Championships medalists
Competitors at the 2005 Winter Universiade